They Stole Our Beauty is a 1997 novel by the French writer Pascal Bruckner. The narrative is set in Paris during summer and follows several people who battle with desires and anxieties. The novel received the Prix Renaudot.

An English translation of the novel was published in 2019 under the title They Stole Our Beauty by British translator Stuart Bell.

Reception
Marianne Payot of L'Express wrote: "Bruckner's miserable heroes continue their struggle with their unfulfilled desires, their vengeful sexuality and the withering of the time. Replaying the myth of Faust, they here embark in a macabre rocambolesque story where no one gets away unscathed. Once again, Bruckner, a shrewd observer, pinpoints the ambiguities of our society."

References

External links
 Publicity page at Éditions Grasset's website 

1997 French novels
French-language novels
Novels by Pascal Bruckner
Novels set in Paris
Éditions Grasset books